The 1961 World Table Tennis Championships mixed doubles was the 26th edition of the mixed doubles championship. 

Ichiro Ogimura and Kimiyo Matsuzaki defeated Li-Fu-jung and Han Yu-chen in the final by three sets to one.

Results

See also
List of World Table Tennis Championships medalists

References

-